"You're the Best" is a 1984 song by Joe Esposito.

It may also refer to:

You're the Best (album) by Keni Burke, 1981
"You're the Best" (The Emotions song), 1984
"You're the Best", a 2016 song by Mamamoo from [[Melting (album)|Melting]]You Are the Best!'', a South Korean TV series